Mayor Joseph Fitzgerald O'Malley Fitzpatrick O'Donnell The Edge "Joe" Quimby, nicknamed Diamond Joe, is a recurring character from the animated sitcom television series The Simpsons. He is voiced by Dan Castellaneta, and first appeared in the episode "Bart Gets an 'F'. Quimby is the mayor of Springfield, and is a composite parody of U.S. Senator Ted Kennedy and certain other members of the Kennedy family who have entered politics.

Concept and creation
Joe Quimby is a parody of Senator from Massachusetts Ted Kennedy and the Kennedy family. Like the Kennedys, Quimby "speaks with a Boston accent, throws money at political problems, and vacations in a coastal resort called the 'Quimby Compound. Dan Castellaneta voices Quimby with mid-Atlantic and Boston accents, resulting in a voice reminiscent of that of President John F. Kennedy.

Appearances
Quimby has long served as the mayor of the city of Springfield. He appears as a slick, opportunistic politician whose chief priorities seem to be keeping himself in office and various other forms of corruption, including embezzling tax money, taking bribes from Fat Tony, and giving monthly kickbacks to Police Chief Wiggum. The seal on the wall of his office reads "Corruptus in Extremis", which means "extremely corrupt".

Like Kennedy, Quimby is known as a womanizer, and occasionally amuses himself with pornographic playing cards during town meetings. Quimby was once the subject of 27 separate paternity suits. One of the women he impregnated is Cookie Kwan, whose baby is remarkably similar to Quimby in both looks and mannerisms. Quimby also is frequently noticed in bed with the same or similar blonde woman/women, at least one of whom was Miss Springfield. He also once accidentally courted his own niece, which is one of the few things Quimby has ever shown shame over.

Despite being the mayor for such a long time, Quimby does not know or care much about his city, often privately (or even publicly) showing his outright contempt for Springfield's citizens. He frequently takes overseas vacations, which take him out of town for extended periods of time, leading to the headline "Mayor Visits City" in the Springfield Shopper. He once referred to Springfield as "Springfeld" at a public meeting. However, he makes frequent, albeit short, public appearances for local festivities, events, business openings, etc.

If bending the law will suit Quimby's purposes, he will likely do so. He once arranged Marge Simpson's release after she was arrested for blocking traffic on a bridge after suffering a nervous breakdown, claiming that if she went to jail, Quimby could kiss the "chick vote" goodbye. He also resorted to bribing witnesses when assault charges were brought against his nephew, leading Bart Simpson to observe that "the system works: just ask Claus von Bülow".

His catchphrase is "Vote Quimby", which he always finds an opportunity to say, even in situations where it would be disadvantageous to identify himself, like inadvertently being caught by Homer in a motel room with his mistress.

Quimby was elected Mayor of Springfield in 1986 (three years before the show's debut) and has been re-elected several times since, despite openly admitting to fraud and wrongdoing. In the season 4 episode "Krusty Gets Kancelled" he admits to using taxpayer dollars to fund the murder of his enemies, but thanks to a clever use of a popular Gabbo catchphrase ("I'm a bad wittle boy"), he is re-elected in a landslide.

Quimby's political stranglehold on Springfield has earned him the hatred of Springfield's small but vocal Republican elite, themselves portrayed as mostly dark, ghoulish figures who meet in a castle. When the Republicans nominate Sideshow Bob as their mayoral candidate, Bob rigs the election, briefly deposing Quimby. He is re-instated when Bob is found guilty of fraud and imprisoned. Later, Quimby briefly flees the city thinking his corruption has been exposed and is deemed to have "abandoned office" and is replaced by a short-lived "council of learned citizens" headed by Lisa Simpson, Professor Frink, Comic Book Guy, Lindsey Naegle, Dr. Hibbert, and Principal Skinner. He also survives a recall election, with no candidate in the race against him (candidates include Rainier Wolfcastle (a Schwarzenegger reference), Kent Brockman, and even Homer Simpson) garnering the five percent necessary to force a recall.

Reception
Literary critic Paul Cantor has cited Mayor Quimby as an example of Springfield's atomistic politics, noting "Mayor Quimby is a demagogue, but at least he is Springfield's own demagogue. When he buys votes, he buys them directly from the citizens of Springfield." During the USA Today contest to choose which Springfield would host the release of The Simpsons Movie, Ted Kennedy himself appears in a video in which he invited "Diamond Joe" Quimby and the film to premiere in Springfield, Massachusetts, and even mocked his own oft-mocked pronunciation of the word "Chowder" (as "Chow-Dah"); however, Springfield, Vermont was chosen instead. On May 17, 2013, following reporting on a new scandal, Justin Peters, crime reporter for Slate magazine compared gaffe-plagued Mayor of Toronto Rob Ford to Quimby. Peters prepared a list of 20 outrageous statements, and asked readers to guess which ones were uttered by the fictional Quimby, and which were uttered by the real life Ford.

See also
 Politics in The Simpsons

References

External links

 Profile of Mayor Quimby from SimpsonsWorld.com
 Mayor Quimbi on IMDb

The Simpsons characters
Animated characters introduced in 1990
Television characters introduced in 1990
Fictional mayors
Fictional Democrats (United States)
Male characters in animated series